Kumeyaay Lake is a lake in San Diego, California. It is situated in the Mission Trails Regional Park. Formerly a gravel pit, its habitat includes riparian and chaparral plants.

References

Bibliography

Lakes of San Diego County, California